The White Trash Debutantes are an American punk rock band from San Francisco, California, United States, active since 1986.

Origins
White Trash Debutante  deals with issues of gender equality and transcendence. The band's original line-up featured thirteen musicians, including lead vocalist Ginger Coyote, vocalists Ariana Uptime and Cindy Uptime, vocalist Roy Wonder, bassist Billy Gould, drummer Michael Crawford, guitarist Jay Crawford, trumpet player Terra Leong, harmonica player Jon Sugar, as well as Jennifer Blowdry, Dean Thomas. White Trash Debutante played its first show on August 30, 1986 at The Stone in San Francisco, opening for Devine.

One critic wrote: "Punk rock has always had its socio-political agitators as well as bands that simply wanted to entertain; White Trash Debutantes are a perfect example of the latter."

Perhaps the political underpinnings of White Trash Debutantes message are not so obvious. A careful listening to their music may betray a commitment to mindless rebellion, sexual deviance, and solipsism: Their music abuts head-on with the rush toward fascism, the lack of compassion, and the aimless goals of the 'American Dream.'

The White Trash Debutantes played an early show at San Francisco's Covered Wagon Saloon on October 18, 1989 for a birthday party for Punk Globe Editor and Debutante Ginger Coyote.

Joey Ramone invited them to partake in his "Circus Of the Perverse" party in New York City playing with the likes of Debbie Harry, Bebe Buell, Ronnie Spector, Lemmy (Motörhead) and the Ramones in 1990.

Film work
George Michalski, the Musical Director for the hit CBS Drama, "Nash Bridges" began using their material on the show's soundtrack.

White Trash Debutantes was featured in the full-length movie "Blast Off.. Shonen Knife" by filmmaker David Markey.
Appeared in the documentary film "A Regular Frankie Fan" about fans of the cult film "The Rocky Horror Picture Show."
Appeared in the feature film "Tweek City", shot in San Francisco; directed by Eric G. Johnson. The band's music also was used in the film's soundtrack.

Awards
The White Trash Debutantes won the Rockies award for "Best Punk Band 2003" and the "Best Punk Band 2004"
at the Rock City News Awards.

White Trash Debutantes were named "Best 2004 Underground Punk Band" and Ginger Coyote "Best 2004 Underground Diva" by Demons In Exile.

Noteworthy events
Ginger Coyote and Jayne County recorded two songs together in June 2006--"Rock n Roll Republikkkan (renamed from "Punk Rock Republican")," in which Jayne and Ginger name some well known 'Republikkkans' in the music industry; "Trans-Generation," a song written by Jayne County as an anthem for those with gender identity issues.

White Trash Debutantes played a memorial tribute for the late Dirk Dirksen "The Pope Of Punk" at The Great American Music Hall along with Jello Biafra and many others.

The band has toured the United States, Canada, Mexico and Japan playing with such notables as Rancid, the Ramones, Green Day, Blondie and The Offspring.

The band generated a lot of publicity when they invited notorious former Olympic skater Tonya Harding to join the band.

At one time, they also had, as a member, an 85-year-old, Patty Pierce (who is featured in the book, Ring Master, by Jerry Springer).

The band has also been featured on many television programs such as Jerry Springer, E Gossip, Inside Edition, Late Night With Conan O'Brien, MTV News and Entertainment Tonight.

Discography

San Francisco - 7" Vinyl Alternative Tentacles
Cheap Date - 12" Vinyl Teen Rebel Records
A Prom Night Gone Bad - CD WTD Records
Crawl For It - CD Desperate Attempt Records
So What's It All About? - White Trash Debutantes/CellBlock5 Split CD Orange Peel Records
Mcrackins/White Trash Debutantes - Split 12" Helter Skelter Records (Italy)
My Guy's Name Is Rudolf - 7" Vinyl 206 Records
It's Raw..... But You Live For It - CD 206 Records
Rock On Sister Friend - Vinyl EP Beer City Records
Psych 9/White Trash Debutantes - Split 7" Vinyl Psych 9 Records (Austria)
Evil Surfin' Bird - CD Booz Records (Japan)

Compilations
Shonen Knife Presents - CD MCA Japan
Let There Be Singles - CD Alternative Tentacles
Black Eyes and Broken Bottles - 12" Vinyl and CD Beer City Records
Best Of Burnt Ramen - CD Ramen Core Records
Get Happy - CD-Slap Happy Records
STRANGLEHOLD: Punk Rock Across The Nation - CD Triple X Records
A Fistful Of Rock n Roll - CD Victory Records
Hear This - CD Sub City Records (includes "Hey Nick... You Did Okay")
LAPD - CD LAPD Records
A Tribute To Johnny Thunders - CD Safety Pin Records
Ambush Attack - CD Ambush Records
It's Just Not Boys Fun - CD Wolverine Records
Rebel Noise Presents - CD Rebel Noise Records
Put A Little Pussy In Your Punk - CD On The Rag Records
Los Todos Ramones - CD Rockaway Records (Argentina)
Punk All Over The World - CD Berlin Records (Germany)
Proud and Loud - CD Music Zombie Records (England)

References

External links
 
 PunkGlobe.com, Punk Globes official website
 Band's purevolume
 WTD at 206 Records
 WTD at Garage Band

Punk rock groups from California
Pop punk groups from California